The following list catalogues the largest, most profitable, and otherwise notable investment banks. This list of investment banks notes full-service banks, financial conglomerates, independent investment banks, private placement firms and notable acquired, merged, or bankrupt investment banks. As an industry it is broken up into the Bulge Bracket (upper tier), Middle Market (mid-level businesses), and boutique market (specialized businesses).

Largest full-service investment banks
The following are the largest full-service global investment banks; full-service investment banks usually provide both advisory and financing banking services, as well as sales, market making, and research on a broad array of financial products, including equities, credit, rates, currency, commodities, and their derivatives. The largest investment banks are noted with the following:
  JPMorgan Chase
  Goldman Sachs
  BofA Securities
  Morgan Stanley
  Citigroup
  UBS
  Credit Suisse
  Deutsche Bank
  HSBC 
  Barclays
  RBC Capital Markets 
  Wells Fargo Securities
  Jefferies Group 
  BNP Paribas
  Mizuho
  Lazard
  Nomura
  Evercore Partners
  BMO Capital Markets
  Mitsubishi UFJ Financial Group
Many of the largest investment banks are considered among the "bulge bracket banks" and as such underwrite the majority of financial transactions in the world. Additionally, banks seeking more deal flow with smaller-sized deals with comparable profitability are known as "middle market investment banks" (known as boutique or independent investment banks).

Financial conglomerates
Large financial-services conglomerates combine commercial banking, investment banking, and sometimes insurance. Such combinations were common in Europe but illegal in the United States prior to the passage of the Gramm-Leach-Bliley Act of 1999.  The following are large investment banking firms (not listed above) that are affiliated with large financial institutions:

 ABN AMRO
 Banca Monte dei Paschi di Siena (MPS Capital Services)
 Banco Bradesco
 Banco Santander
 Bank of China (BOC International Holdings)
 Bank of Communications (BOCOM International Holdings)
 BBVA
 Berenberg Bank
 Canadian Imperial Bank of Commerce (CIBC World Markets)
 China CITIC Bank
 China Construction Bank (CCB International Holdings)
 CIMB
 Commerzbank
 Crédit Agricole 
 Daiwa Securities
 DBS Bank (Capital Markets Group)
 Desjardins Group (Desjardins Capital Markets)
 Handelsbanken
 ICICI Bank
 Industrial and Commercial Bank of China (ICBC International Holdings)
 ING Group
 Intesa Sanpaolo (Banca IMI)
 İş Bankası (Is Investment)
 Itaú Unibanco (Itaú BBA)
 BTG Pactual
 KBC Bank
 KeyCorp (KeyBanc Capital Markets)
 Kotak Mahindra Bank
 Laurentian Bank of Canada (Laurentian Bank Securities)
 Lloyds Banking Group (Lloyds Bank Wholesale Banking & Markets)
 M&T Bank 
 Macquarie Group
 Maybank
 Mediobanca
 Mizuho Financial Group
 National Bank of Canada (National Bank Financial Markets)
 Natixis
 Nordea
 PNC Financial Services (Harris Williams & Company)
 Rabobank
 RHB Bank
/ Rothschild & Co
 Sanlam
 Sberbank
 Scotiabank (Scotia Capital)
 SEB
 Société Générale
 Standard Bank
 Standard Chartered Bank
 State Bank of India (SBI Capital Markets) 
 Stifel Financial (Stifel Nicolaus)
 Sumitomo Mitsui Financial Group
 SunTrust (Robinson Humphrey)
 TD Securities
 Truist Financial
 UniCredit (UBM)
 VTB Bank (VTB Capital)

Private placement companies 
Private placement agents, including companies that specialize in fundraising for private equity funds:
 Atlantic-Pacific Capital
 Campbell Lutyens
 Cogent Partners
 Helix Associates
 J.P. Morgan Cazenove
 Park Hill Group
 Probitas Partners

Other notable advisory and capital markets firms
The following is a list of other boutique advisory firms and capital markets firms that have some notability:
 BDO International (BDO Capital Advisors)
 Berkery, Noyes & Co
 BG Capital
 BGR Capital & Trade
 Brewin Dolphin
 Capital One (Capital One Securities)
 Deloitte (Deloitte Corporate Finance)
 Duff & Phelps
 Ernst & Young (Ernst & Young Capital Advisors)
 KPMG (KPMG Corporate Finance)
 Marlin & Associates
 PwC (PwC Corporate Finance)
 Roth Capital Partners
 Sheshunoff Management Services

Notable former investment banks and brokerages
The following are notable investment banking and brokerage firms that have been liquidated, acquired or merged and no longer operate under the same name.

See also
List of private-equity firms
List of investment banking private equity groups
List of asset management firms
Sovereign wealth fund
List of exchange-traded funds
Boutique investment bank

References

 
Investment
Investment Banking
Knowledge firms